Leonard John Celistus Culhane (otherwise known as J. Leonard Culhane) FRS (born 14 October 1937) is an Irish-born British astronomer, former director of the Mullard Space Science Laboratory at University College London.

Career
He commenced his academic career as a lecturer at University College, London (1967–1976) with a short break as a researcher in Lockheed Palo Alto Laboratory, California in 1969, rising to be Reader in Physics from 1976 to 1981 and professor of physics from 1981 to 2006.  During that time he was deputy director and then director of the Mullard Space Science Laboratory (1981–2003). On his retirement in 2006 he became emeritus professor of physics.

His interests lay in the fields of space instrumentation, solar physics, X-ray astronomy and EUV/X-ray spectroscopy.

He was chairman of the European Space Sciences Committee from 1998 to 2002.

Honors and awards
 1970: elected member of the International Astronomical Union
 1985: elected fellow, Royal Society of London
 1991-1994: vice-president, European Space Agency Science Programme Committee
 1991: elected full member of the International Academy of Astronautics
 1993: awarded honorary doctorate of science, University of Wroclaw
 1996: elected foreign member of the Norwegian Academy of Science and Letters
 2001: elected member Academia Europaea
 2005: Royal Aeronautical Society, Specialist Silver Award and Geoffrey Pardoe Space Prize
 2007: Awarded Gold Medal of the Royal Astronomical Society in astronomy
 2008: Elected Fellow of University College London

Works
J. Leonard Culhane, Peter W. Sanford, X-ray astronomy,  Faber, 1981, 
J. Leonard Culhane, Eijirō Hiei (eds) Solar flare, coronal, and heliospheric dynamics, Pergamon, 1995
J. Leonard Culhane, Robert D. Bentley, John Gerard Doyle, R. Jeffrey Wilkes (eds), The sun and similar stars cosmic ray spectra and composition, Pergamon, 2001

References

1937 births
Living people
Place of birth missing (living people)
20th-century British astronomers
Academics of UCL Mullard Space Science Laboratory
Fellows of the Royal Society
Recipients of the Gold Medal of the Royal Astronomical Society
Members of the Norwegian Academy of Science and Letters